Methanosarcinales is an order of archaeans in the class Methanomicrobia.

Large amounts of methane are produced in marine sediments but are then consumed before contacting aerobic waters or the atmosphere. Although no organism that can consume methane anaerobically has ever been isolated, biogeochemical evidence indicates that the overall process involves a transfer of electrons from methane to sulphate and is probably mediated by several organisms, including a methanogen (operating in reverse) and a sulfate-reducer (using an unknown intermediate substrate).

Organisms placed within the order can be found in freshwater, saltwater, salt-rich sediments, laboratory digestors, and animal digestive systems.  Most cells have cell walls that lack peptidoglycan and pseudomurein. They are strictly anaerobic and survive by producing methane.  Some species use acetate as a substrate and others use methyl compounds, such as methyl amines and methyl sulfates.

Phylogeny

See also
 List of Archaea genera

References

Further reading

Scientific journals

Scientific books
 
 
  Version 5.0.

External links

Archaea taxonomic orders
Euryarchaeota